Javier Barros Sierra (25 February 1915 – 5 May 1971) was a Mexican engineer and rector of the National Autonomous University of Mexico during the 1968 Tlatelolco massacre.

Career

Born in Mexico City, he studied civil engineering at the National Autonomous University of Mexico. He became president of the student society of the Faculty of Sciences in 1936 and University Counsellor in 1938. He taught for more than 20 years in the Escuela Nacional Preparatoria (a high school of UNAM) and the National School of Engineering (later Faculty of Engineering), of whom he was director from 1955 to 1958. He became Rector on May 5, 1966. During his rectorship, the government and the army entered Ciudad Universitaria, UNAM's main campus. In protest of these actions and the indiscriminate beating of UNAM's students, he resigned his post on September 23, 9 days before the massacre in Tlatelolco. He was reinstated as Rector after the liberation of CU, a post he held until May 5, 1970.

References

1915 births
1971 deaths
Mexican civil engineers
People from Mexico City